iStumbler is a utility for finding wireless networks and devices with AirPort- or Bluetooth-enabled Macintosh computers.

iStumbler was originally based on MacStumbler source code. Its early development focused on detection of open wireless (802.11) networks, but more recent versions support the detection of Bluetooth wireless devices and Bonjour network services.

Up to release 99, iStumbler was open-source under a BSD license.

See also
 KisMAC – a wireless network discovery tool for Mac OS X.
 WiFi Explorer – a wireless network scanner for Mac OS X.
 Netspot – A Mac OS X tool for wireless networks assessment, scanning and surveys.

External links

References

MacOS network-related software
Free network-related software